Arasinakunte (also known as Arisinakunte) is a village in the southern state of Karnataka, India. It is located in the Nelamangala taluk of Bangalore Rural district.

Demographics 
As per the 2011 India census, Arasinakunte had a population of 10,567 with 5,422 males and 5,145 females.

Bus Route from Bengaluru City 
Yeshwantapura - Darasahalli

See also 

 Bangalore Rural
 Districts of Karnataka

References

External links 

 https://bangalorerural.nic.in/en/

Villages in Bangalore Rural district